Damian Tambini is a senior lecturer at the London School of Economics, and an associate fellow at the Institute for Public Policy Research (IPPR) and the Oxford Internet Institute. He is also a Fellow of the Royal Society of Arts and serves on the advisory Groups of the Oxford Media Convention and Polis. He also teaches for the TRIUM Global Executive MBA Program, an alliance of NYU Stern, the London School of Economics and HEC School of Management. Damian Tambini is on the Advisory Board of the Center for International Media Ethics.

Academic career
From June 2002 to August 2006 he served as Head of the Programme in Comparative Media Law and Policy at Oxford University. Before that he was at Nuffield College, Oxford (Postdoctoral Fellow, 1998); Humboldt University, Berlin (Lecturer, 1997); and the European University Institute, Florence, Italy (PhD, 1996). His research interests include media and telecommunications policy and democratic communication.

Personal life
Tambini is married to Helen Mountfield.

Works

 "Padania's Virtual Nationalism". Telos 109 (Fall 1996). New York: Telos Press.

References

External links
Damian Tambini's departmental profile at the LSE
TRIUM Global Executive MBA Program

Year of birth missing (living people)
Living people
Academic staff of the European University Institute
Academics of the London School of Economics
Academics of the University of Oxford
Fellows of Nuffield College, Oxford
Academic staff of the Humboldt University of Berlin